James Jackson (born Gregory James Daniel; November 11, 1985), known professionally by his online alias Onision, is an American YouTuber. His primary YouTube channel, "Onision", featured sketches and satirical clips; videos posted to his other channels focus on personal stories covering controversial topics as well as discussion with his viewers. His online content has attracted controversy and criticism from online media outlets and viewers alike, as well as many allegations of misconduct in his private life.

As of June 2022, Jackson's main Onision channel had received over 2 million subscribers and over 330 million video views; his secondary channel "UhOhBro" had received just under 2 million subscribers and over 370 million video views; and his vlog channel "OnisionSpeaks" had received over 1.4 million subscribers and over 550 million video views. A music video titled "Banana Song (I'm a Banana)", written and performed by Jackson, is his most-viewed video; as of October 2022, it had garnered over 91 million views.

Early life
Jackson was born Gregory James Daniel on November 11, 1985, in Auburn, Washington. Jackson has told fans that his mother raised him and his older sisters in a rural environment and that they were Seventh-day Adventists. Additionally, in his 2014 self-published Facts About Onision (Story Time) video, Jackson states that his mother "filed for divorce once it was made clear that his father was a child predator". During his teenage years, Jackson composed music and worked on web and graphic design. Jackson started his first online forum in 2004, using the same "Onision" alias he would employ in his YouTube career. In a similar way to how he would later critique young women on their appearance, Jackson would rate different races and skin colors on their attractiveness. 

Jackson served in the United States Air Force in 2005, and received a general discharge under honorable conditions in 2008.

Online career

Video content
Jackson began filming comedy sketches of himself in 2004, under the alias "Mr. Odd."

Jackson created his YouTube channel in 2006 but did not upload any content until October 2007. His earliest clips featured a character named Chibi, whom fans interpreted as a parody of Fred Figglehorn. In 2019, Insider wrote that Jackson was "best known for his objectifying content and controversial reputation", and detailed that "he rates pictures that women submit to him, gives his opinions on their bodies, and comments on other YouTubers".

In 2009, Jackson uploaded "Banana Song (I'm a Banana)", which went viral. The video featured Jackson "jumping around screaming in a banana suit", as well as his first wife, Skye Tantaga. "Banana Song" was featured on the Comedy Central series Tosh.0 as the "Viewer Video of the Week" in 2010.

In 2011, Jackson posted a number of clips with his then-girlfriend, Canadian singer Shiloh Hoganson. The clips were scripted but presented in a manner many fans interpreted as unscripted. In some of them, however, Hoganson is seen apparently experiencing transient amnesia; Adrienne Jourgensen, an ex-girlfriend of Jackson's, published a letter stating that Jackson believed Hoganson was lying about her memory loss. Jackson and Hoganson later stated that she was pregnant but suffered a miscarriage. In 2019, a video featuring Hoganson resurfaced online; in it, Jackson is heard telling her, "You know this video is never going to be online, right? No one will ever know how much I abuse you", before throwing candy corn at her and laughing as Hoganson cried.

Reception and criticism
Jackson's on-camera and off-camera activity has received criticism from online media outlets as well as from fellow online content creators. In 2010, Tubefilter listed Jackson as one of "5 YouTubers On Their Way Up", alongside Shane Dawson and the Fine Brothers. The outlet described Jackson's channel as frequently updated with a "very rough, in-your-face R-rated style" and called Jackson "the most controversial YouTuber". In 2012, The Daily Dot described Jackson as "known for his militant vegetarianism, sex appeal, comedic skits, and controversial views on topics like circumcision." The publication has also criticized his content on multiple occasions; in 2013, James Cook wrote for the outlet, calling Jackson "YouTube's most troubled star".

In 2018, Jackson was included on a Daily Dot-published list of six YouTubers "worse" than Logan Paul. The outlet opined that "[Jackson's] videos these days [2018] are just as obnoxious and irritating as they were nine years ago when he first struck YouTube gold with a truly terrible song about being a banana." Jackson has also received criticism from fellow YouTubers, notably Daniel Sulzbach (known online as "MrRepzion" or "Repzion"), Strange Æons, and Blaire White. In a 2019 email to Insider, Jackson shared that "People hated me, with a passion, for my opinions I openly held." In late 2019, Insider called Jackson "one of YouTube's most reviled personalities".

Controversies

Event and platform bans
Jackson was banned from VidCon 2012 due to a video in which he stated that since his then girlfriend Adrienne Jorgensen slept with more than 20 people before she was with him, she is a "slut" and therefore "cannot be raped". The video then received backlash from viewers outside of Jackson's core audience, as noted by NewMediaRockstars and The Daily Dot. VidCon co-founder Hank Green sent an email to Jackson stating "if it is possible that you will not be safe, we will not let you come [to VidCon]."

In November 2019, Jackson was banned from Patreon after posting the phone number of Billie Dawn Webb, a fellow YouTuber. Webb was one of several women who claimed Jackson and his spouse had groomed and manipulated them into a sexual relationship or otherwise engaged in harassment and abuse. Patreon confirmed in a statement to The Verge that they had banned Jackson "as he violated our Bullying and Harassment [policy] as it relates to doxing." In response to the ban, Jackson uploaded a video where he seemingly contorted himself, stripped down to his underwear, and poured a bottle of kombucha over his head. Jackson later said this, and a series of follow-up videos, were staged. Jackson subsequently opened a new website where his supporters could re-donate, but shut it down shortly after its launch.

In January 2021, following the release of Onision: In Real Life, Jackson's channels were suspended from the YouTube Partner Program.

Allegations of abuse, child grooming and rape
In 2019, allegations of child grooming and abuse were leveled at Jackson and his spouse, Kai Avaroe, formerly known as Lainey. Jackson responded by stating that "the grooming stuff is absolute nonsense". As aforementioned, Billie Dawn Webb also made allegations of abuse by Jackson and Avaroe, stating that they were sent texts asking them to "be chained to [the] basement wall for a week with a sign around [their] neck that says 'I'm sorry for lying.'"

When reached by Insider for a comment in response to these allegations, Jackson requested $10,000 for an interview and stated: "I do not want to participate in this circus without compensation, I should be paid to endure to  stupidity of the current state of outrage/online culture."

In January 2020, Jackson called 9-1-1 on American television journalist Chris Hansen and lawyer Mike Morse in response to them knocking on his door. He described Hansen and his crew as "YouTube stalkers". Morse, referring to Jackson, stated that "It concerns me that he [has] two kids in the home," and that he "really didn't like what I was hearing about this guy". Hansen had also previously reached out to Jackson for interview, with Jackson requesting $350,000 in exchange for his participation.

According to a February 2020 article by The Daily Beast, Hansen's investigative team alleges that Jackson has exploited his online fame for nearly a decade by grooming young fans and "coercing them into sexually and emotionally abusive relationships".

On February 9, 2023, it was reported that a lawsuit is being filed against Jackson and Avaroe for using his popular YouTube channels to “recruit, solicit, and groom” underaged children into having sex with him, with YouTube and its parent company Google also named as co-defendants for continuing to monetize his channels.

On March 2, 2023, a second suit was filed against Jackson, Avaroe, YouTube and Google by a woman named Sarah. Sarah began online communication with Avaroe in 2014, when Sarah was fourteen years old, and eventually visited or stayed with the couple on ten occasions between September 2016 and July 2019. In October 2016, Sarah's mother signed over power of attorney and guardianship of Sarah to Avaroe. The suit alleges that from there, the couple began desensitizing Sarah to sexually charged jokes and conversation, and touching her inappropriately. The suit also alleges that this behavior culminated in a January 2019 incident where Jackson raped Sarah, then eighteen years old, by digitally and vaginally penetrating her without her consent, and demanded she sign a non-disclosure agreement the next day. Jackson has denied raping Sarah, instead alleging in since deleted or privatized videos that she raped and "sexually extorted" him.

In media 
A documentary about Jackson titled Onision: In Real Life was broadcast on January 4, 2021, during the launch of Discovery+, with Chris Hansen as producer and consultant.

Bibliography 
Novels
Stones to Abbigale (2015)
This Is Why I Hate You (2015)
Reaper's Creek (2018)
Biography
In Real Life (2023)

References

External links

YouTube channels:
Onision
OnisionSpeaks

1985 births
Living people
21st-century American male musicians
21st-century American male writers
American former Christians
American atheists
American YouTubers
Comedy YouTubers
Critics of religions
Entertainers from Washington (state)
Former Seventh-day Adventists
Internet-related controversies
Internet memes
Place of birth missing (living people)
United States Air Force airmen
Vegetarian-related mass media
Video bloggers
Writers from Washington (state)
YouTube channels launched in 2006
YouTube controversies